Chlorethe scabrosa is a species of beetle in the family Cerambycidae, found in Argentina and Brazil. It was described by Zajciw in 1963.

References

Compsocerini
Beetles described in 1963